Stamford Bridge is a historic bridge, in the village of Stamford Bridge, in the East Riding of Yorkshire in England.

In the Roman period, the River Derwent could be crossed near the fort of Derventio by a ford.  The first bridge in the area is believed to have been built during the existence of the Kingdom of Northumbria, a narrow, timber structure, which may have been on the site of the ford, or about 150 metres downstream.  The next record of a bridge is in 1280, on the downstream site, and this is probably the same structure described in 1581 as having stone piers supporting a timber bridge.

In 1727, a new bridge was constructed, a further 150 metres downstream, where the river is narrower but deeper.  It was designed by William Etty.  It is built of stone, with three arches: a wider central arch, and narrower north and south arches which are usually dry.  There are narrow refuges, formerly for pedestrians, and a stone parapet.

In 1765, the road became a turnpike, and it was tolled until 1812.  Its southern span was widened in the 19th century.  It has been grade II* listed since 1952, and was formerly also a scheduled ancient monument.  The bridge now carries the A166 road, from York to Bridlington.  In 1967, a steel footbridge was constructed alongside the road bridge.

References

Bridges in the East Riding of Yorkshire
Buildings and structures completed in 1727
Grade II* listed buildings in the East Riding of Yorkshire
Grade II* listed bridges in England
Stamford Bridge